The  is a limited access Tokyo-Chiba toll road in Japan. It is owned and operated by East Nippon Expressway Company.

Naming 
Keiyō is a kanji acronym of two characters, each representing the two major urban areas connected by the route. The first character represents  and the second represents 

The route is officially designated as National Route 14 (Shinozaki Interchange to Anagawa Interchange) and a bypass for National Route 16 (Anagawa Interchange to the terminus).

Overview 
The road is an important artery in the eastern part of the Tokyo urban area, carrying an average of 315,236 vehicles per day.

Starting in Edogawa Ward, Tokyo, the road crosses the Edo River to the east into Chiba Prefecture, passing through the cities of Ichikawa, Funabashi, and Narashino. In this area the road is roughly parallel to the Higashi-Kantō Expressway a few kilometers to the south. The road meets this expressway at Miyanogi Junction and then turns south, passing through the city of Chiba. At the south end of the city beyond Soga Interchange the Keiyō Road terminates, however the roadway continues as the Tateyama Expressway.

The speed limit is 60 km/h on the section designated as Route 14, and 80 km/h on the section designated as Route 16.

Tolls 

For the purposes of toll assessment, the road is divided into six sections. Usage of one section incurs a toll of 100 yen for passenger cars, light trucks, and 2-wheeled vehicles, 150 yen for large trucks and buses, and 350 yen for oversized vehicles. Traversing the entire road therefore costs 600 yen for a passenger car.

The method of toll collection differs depending on the section of road used. From Shinozaki Interchange to Miyanogi Junction, toll booths at interchanges and toll gates on the main route are positioned so that a flat rate is charged at each station. From Miyanogi Junction to the terminus, tickets are issued upon entering the road which are used to calculate the toll at the exit point; this is the same system used on the Higashi-Kantō and Tateyama Expressways. Electronic Toll Collection (ETC) is accepted for payment, however commuter, off-peak, and late night discounts do not apply.

Due to the positioning of toll collection points, there are a few potential journeys that do not incur any toll at all. These include travelling only between Shinozaki Interchange and Ichikawa Interchange, travelling only between Takeishi Interchange and Makuhari Interchange, and also entering the road at Takeshi Interchange and exiting at Hanawa Interchange.

List of interchanges and features
 IC - interchange, JCT - junction, PA - parking area, TN - tunnel, TB - toll gate

References

External links 
  East Nippon Expressway Company

Toll roads in Japan
Roads in Chiba Prefecture
Roads in Tokyo